Bridge of Dee railway station served the settlement of Bridge of Dee, Dumfries and Galloway, Scotland from 1864 to 1949 on the Kirkcudbright Railway.

History 
The station opened on 18 April 1864 by the Glasgow and South Western Railway. To the south was the goods yard and to the north was the signal box, which opened in 1882. It closed in 1925 and was replaced by a ground frame. The station closed to both passengers and goods traffic on 26 September 1949.

References

External links 

Disused railway stations in Dumfries and Galloway
Railway stations in Great Britain opened in 1864
Railway stations in Great Britain closed in 1949
1864 establishments in Scotland
1949 disestablishments in Scotland
Former Glasgow and South Western Railway stations